The General Noble Tree was a Giant Sequoia tree formerly within the Converse Basin Grove, with its site located in Giant Sequoia National Monument of the Sierra Nevada, in Fresno County, California. It was one of the largest trees on the planet during that time, before it was felled in 1892 to create an exhibit for the 1893 World's Columbian Exposition held in Chicago.

Description
It was the second largest tree in the Converse Basin Grove after the Boole Tree and was among the top 30 largest tree by volume before it was cut down. It was also the largest tree ever felled.

The tree, named the General Noble in honor of Secretary of the Interior John Willock Noble, stood just outside the borders of Sequoia National Park. Despite the recommendation by Noble to create the national park that put many sequoias under protection, his namesake tree was not protected by federal law. This allowed it to be cut down.

The process of cutting and transporting the General Noble Tree was labor-intensive and costly. The tree had to be hollowed out and divided into sections, which were then transported by teams of 16 mules pulling specialized wagons over a rough mountain road. The work was carried out by the King's River Lumber Company, which then sub-divided the tree into 46 smaller sections, some of which weighed over 4 tons each. These sections were then transported by train, requiring 11 railroad cars to complete the journey from California to Chicago. The total cost of cutting, shipping, and installing the tree was $10,475.87.

On display
The General Noble Tree was displayed at the 1893 World's Columbian Exposition in Chicago, where it was met with skepticism and dubbed the "California Hoax" by some who found it hard to believe that it was a real tree. After the exposition, the tree was shipped to Washington D.C., where it was transformed into a house-like structure and placed in front of the Main Building of the Department of Agriculture. It served as a tourist attraction for over 40 years before eventually decaying.

Chicago Stump
The remains of the General Noble Tree are known as the Chicago Stump, which can be seen in the Converse Basin Grove.

See also
List of largest giant sequoias
List of individual trees

References

External links

Individual giant sequoia trees
Giant Sequoia National Monument
Natural history of Fresno County, California
World's Columbian Exposition
1890s individual tree deaths
1892 in California
Destroyed individual trees